Footsteps 2 is singer-songwriter Chris de Burgh's nineteenth album. It was released in Germany, Switzerland and Austria on 14 October 2011, and in the UK and Ireland on 17 October 2011.

Footsteps 2 follows the concept with that of Footsteps, creating cover versions of the songs which have inspired him over the years, along with a few new compositions.

As de Burgh said upon releasing Footsteps, "Listening to the great songwriters was the inspiration for me to try and become a good songwriter myself," he says. "I’m talking about the likes of Lennon & McCartney and Bob Dylan; people as good as that just don’t seem to exist any more. I learned my trade, my craft, almost at the feet of the Great Masters. And that is my musical journey. Those songs are my footsteps."

This album peaked at number 10 in the German album chart, and reached number 38 in the UK Albums Chart.

Track listing 
"While You See a Chance" (Steve Winwood, Will Jennings) - 4:58
"Let It Be" (John Lennon, Paul McCartney) - 4:07
"The Living Years" (Mike Rutherford, B. A. Robertson) - 5:37
"Blue Bayou" (Roy Orbison, Joe Melson) - 2:40
"SOS" (Björn Ulvaeus, Benny Andersson, Stig Anderson) - 3:21
"Seven Bridges" (Helmut Richter, Ulrich Swillms, Chris de Burgh) - 3:53
"Lady Madonna" (John Lennon, Paul McCartney) - 2:21
"Time in a Bottle" (Jim Croce) - 2:33
"Already There" (Chris de Burgh) - 3:46
"In the Ghetto" (Mac Davis, Elvis Presley) - 3:46
"Long Train Running" (Tom Johnston) - 3:39
"On a Christmas Night" (Chris de Burgh) - 3:33
"Catch the Wind" (Donovan) [Special Edition only] - 2:14
"Moonshadow" (Cat Stevens) [Special Edition only] - 3:01
"Every Step of the Way" (Chris de Burgh) - 3:18
"The Footsteps 2 Theme" (Chris de Burgh) - 1:57

A version of the album released by Sony Music in Denmark has a different running order and includes a 25th anniversary version of "The Lady in Red", unavailable elsewhere.

Personnel 
 Chris de Burgh – lead vocals, guitars 
 Phil Palmer – guitars, backing vocals 
 Nigel Hopkins – keyboards, orchestral arrangements, backing vocals 
 Ed Poole – bass, backing vocals 
 Geoff Dugmore – drums, percussion, hammered dulcimer
 Jakko Jakszyk – harmonica, backing vocals 
 Gavin Fitzjohn – horns, horn arrangements 
 Geoffrey Richardson – strings, string arrangements 
 Suzanne Barbieri – backing vocals
 Django Jakszyk – backing vocals
 Vula Malinga – backing vocals

Production 
 Chris de Burgh – producer, sleeve design 
 Chris Porter – producer, engineer, mixing 
 Jason Elliott – additional engineer 
 Joe Kearns – additional engineer 
 Alex Hutchinson – art direction 
 Sarah Fulford – sleeve design, photography 
 Kenny Thomson – sleeve design, management 
 David Morley – photography

Studios 
 Recorded at British Grove and Stanley House (London, UK).
 Mixed at Stanley House

Charts

Weekly charts

Year-end charts

References

Chris de Burgh albums
2011 albums
Covers albums